Miqueliopuntia is a monotypic, genus of cactus in the Cactaceae family, containing a single species, Miqueliopuntia miquelii , which is native to the Chilean coasts of South America.

Both genus and species were published in Kakteen Südamerika vol.3 on page 869 in 1980.

The genus name of Miqueliopuntia is in honour of Friedrich Anton Wilhelm Miquel (1811–1871), who was a Dutch botanist, whose main focus of study was on the flora of the Dutch East Indies.

References

Cacti of South America
Flora of Chile
Opuntioideae genera
Monotypic Cactaceae genera
Opuntioideae